Raymond Edwin "Chick" Sorrells (July 31, 1896 – July 20, 1983) was a Major League Baseball shortstop who played for one season. He played for the Cleveland Indians for two games during the 1922 Cleveland Indians season.

Sorrells was one of a group of players that Indians player-manager Tris Speaker sent in partway through the game on September 21, 1922, done as an opportunity for fans to see various minor league prospects.

References

External links

1896 births
1983 deaths
Major League Baseball shortstops
Cleveland Indians players
Baseball players from Oklahoma
St. Edward's Hilltoppers baseball players
People from Atoka County, Oklahoma